A list of the most films produced in the Cinema of Mexico ordered by year of release in the 1980s. For an alphabetical list of articles on Mexican films see :Category:Mexican films.

1980
 List of Mexican films of 1980

1981
 List of Mexican films of 1981

1982
 List of Mexican films of 1982

1983
 List of Mexican films of 1983

1984
 List of Mexican films of 1984

1985
 List of Mexican films of 1985

1986
 List of Mexican films of 1986

1987
 List of Mexican films of 1987

1988
 List of Mexican films of 1988

1989
 List of Mexican films of 1989

External links
 Mexican film at the Internet Movie Database

Mexican
Films

fr:Liste de films mexicains
zh:墨西哥電影列表